The Niesen is a mountain peak of the Bernese Alps in the Canton of Bern, Switzerland.

It overlooks Lake Thun, in the Bernese Oberland region, and forms the northern end of a ridge that stretches north from the Albristhorn and Mannliflue, separating the Simmental and Kandertal valleys.

Geography
Administratively, the summit is shared between the municipalities of Reichenbach im Kandertal to the southeast, and Wimmis to the west and north. Both municipalities are in the canton of Bern.

The summit can be reached easily by using the Niesenbahn funicular from Mülenen (near Reichenbach). The construction of the funicular was completed in 1910.

Alongside the funicular is the longest stairway in the world, with 11,674 steps. It is only open to the public once a year for a stair run event.

Originally the mountains name was Yesen. «An Yesen» transformed to Niesen. Yesen is yellow gentian and still flowers on the Niesen to this day.
 Because of its shape, the Niesen is often called the Swiss Pyramid. The Niesen may have influenced some modernist paintings by Paul Klee, in which an abstracted pyramidal form is seen.

See also
 
 List of mountains of Switzerland accessible by public transport

References

External links
Niesen.ch: Niesen News website—
 Nesen-funicular.ch: Niesen Funicular website—
Hikr.org: Niesen
Meteocentrale.ch: Current weather data and forecast for Niesen-Kulm—

Gallery

Bernese Alps
Mountains of the Alps
Mountains of the canton of Bern
Two-thousanders of Switzerland